George Smith King, Jr. (August 16, 1928 – October 5, 2006) was an American professional basketball player and collegiate coach. He was born in Charleston, West Virginia.

College career
George King attended Morris Harvey College (now the University of Charleston), where he led his team to four NCAA championship tournaments. He averaged 31.2 points per game in 1950 and scored a total of 2,535 points in 117 games in his college career. He received his A.B. degree in physical education in 1950. In both his junior and senior years, he was named West Virginia's Amateur Athlete of the Year.

Professional career
George King was picked in the 8th round of the 1950 NBA draft. He played for the Bartlesville Phillips 66ers in 1950-1951.

In 1955, King led the Syracuse Nationals to the Finals, where he hit the series-clinching free throw in Game 7 and had a key steal to win the championship. After five seasons with the Nationals, he spent his last season in the NBA with the Cincinnati Royals. He holds career averages of 10.3 points, 3.9 rebounds and 4.8 assists a game in six seasons.

In 1956, King toured eleven Middle East countries with the Nationals for the Educational Exchange Service of the State Department. A year later, he became the first American to give basketball coaching clinics in Africa.

College coaching career

Morris Harvey College
After his tenure with the Nationals, King spent a season coaching college basketball at his alma mater, Morris Harvey, before returning for his last season in the NBA with the Royals.

West Virginia
George King began his coaching career at West Virginia University as an assistant under head coach Fred Schaus. In 1961, he became the head coach after Schaus left for the chance to coach the Los Angeles Lakers. He coached the Mountaineers with an overall record of 102-43 and led them to three Southern Conference tournament championships and three NCAA tournaments.

Before King began his coaching career, he received his master's degree in physical education at WVU in 1957 (before he ended his NBA career).

Purdue
King moved on to coaching at Purdue University, located in West Lafayette, Indiana, where he took over for Ray Eddy at the head coaching position. During his tenure, he compiled a 109–64 record. In 1969, he led the Boilermakers to their first Big Ten Championship in 29 years, and the first postseason appearance in school history. They made the most of it, advancing all the way to the NCAA title game, losing to John Wooden's UCLA. In that 1968–69 season, Purdue led the nation with 94.8 points a game on a team that consisted of notable players such as Rick Mount and Billy Keller. He was succeeded by his predecessor at West Virginia, Fred Schaus. He served as the school's athletic director from then on until 1992.

For the next 21 years as Purdue's seventh athletics director, King directed the Boilermaker program through a period of tremendous growth and change. He oversaw the emergence of women's athletics at the varsity level at Purdue in 1976–77. Extremely revered by his peers in the profession, King served as President of the National Association of Collegiate Directors of Athletics (NACDA), and chairperson of the NCAA's prestigious Committee on Committees and the NCAA Postseason Bowl (now known as Special Events) committee.
He was one of the youngest AD's in the nation and was the only one who also coached in the 1971–72 season. King is a member of both the Purdue and the University of Charleston Athletic Halls of Fame.

Later years and death
King received an honorary doctorate from the renamed University of Charleston in 1983, when he was also named recipient of a Distinguished Alumni Award. He was named to the prestigious Honors Committee of the National Basketball Hall of Fame in Springfield, Massachusetts, in 1982, and to the University of Charleston Athletic Hall of Fame in 1985. He also was honored as the recipient of NACDA's 1990 James J. Corbett Memorial Award.

King retired from Purdue in 1992 and was named to the school's Hall of Fame in 2001.

King died at the age of 78 at the Hospice of Naples in Naples, Florida, around 11:30 a.m. of October 5, 2006, surrounded by his family. He is survived by his spouse of 57 years, Jeanne G. King; children George, Kristy Jeanne, Kathy Jan, Kerry Jo and Gordon Scott; 18 grandchildren; nine great grandchildren; many nieces and nephews; and two sisters.

Head coaching record

See also
 List of NCAA Division I Men's Final Four appearances by coach

References

External links
Career Statistics

1928 births
2006 deaths
American men's basketball coaches
American men's basketball players
Basketball coaches from West Virginia
Basketball players from West Virginia
Charleston Golden Eagles men's basketball coaches
Charleston Golden Eagles men's basketball players
Chicago Stags draft picks
Cincinnati Royals players
College men's basketball head coaches in the United States
Phillips 66ers players
Point guards
Purdue Boilermakers athletic directors
Purdue Boilermakers men's basketball coaches
Sportspeople from Charleston, West Virginia
Syracuse Nationals players
West Virginia Mountaineers men's basketball coaches